Portel may refer to the following places:

 Portel, Portugal, a municipality in Portugal
 Portel, Pará, a municipality in Brazil

See also 
 Le Portel, Pas-de-Calais, France
 Canton of Le Portel, northern France
 Col de Portel, mountain pass in the French Pyrenees
 Portel-des-Corbières, southern France